"Grand Groove" is the second single released from Tragedy: Saga of a Hoodlum, the second album by Tragedy Khadafi (then known as Intelligent Hoodlum)

Single track listing
"Grand Groove Part II"
"Grand Groove Part I"
"Grand Groove Part II (Instrumental)"
"At Large (LP Version)"
"At Large (Marley Mix)"
"At Large (Instrumental)"

Samples
Grand Groove Part II
"Ike's Mood" by Isaac Hayes
At Large (LP Version)
"Synthetic Substitution" by Melvin Bliss
"Feel the Heartbeat" by The Treacherous Three
"Warm It Up, Kane" by Big Daddy Kane
At Large (Marley Mix)
"N.T." by Kool & The Gang
"Get Off Your Ass and Jam" by Funkadelic
"UFO" by ESG

References

1993 singles
Tragedy Khadafi songs
1993 songs
Song recordings produced by Marley Marl
A&M Records singles